Marian may refer to:

People
 Mari people, a Finno-Ugric ethnic group in Russia
 Marian (given name), a list of people with the given name
 Marian (surname), a list of people so named

Places
Marian, Iran (disambiguation)
 Marian, Queensland, a town in Australia
 Marian, a village in toe commune of Hîrtop, Transnistria, Moldova
 Lake Marian, New Zealand
 Marian Cove, King George Island, South Shetland Islands
 Mt Marian, Tasmania, a mountain in Australia
 Marian, Albania, a village near Lekas, Korçë County

Christianity
 Marian, an adjective for things relating to the Blessed Virgin Mary (Roman Catholic), specifically Marian devotions
 Congregation of Marian Fathers, also known as Marians of the Immaculate Conception, a Roman Catholic male clerical congregation

Schools
 Marian Academy, a Roman Catholic private school in Georgetown, Guyana
 Marian College (disambiguation)
 Marian High School (disambiguation)
 Marian University (Indiana)
 Marian University (Wisconsin)
 The Marian School, a Catholic private school in Currajong, Queensland, Australia
 Omaha Marian

Art, entertainment, and media

Fictional entities
 Mariane, a character in Tartuffe by Molière
 Marian Hawke, the female player character of Dragon Age II (the name may be changed)

Music
 "Marian", a song by the British gothic rock band The Sisters of Mercy
 Marian Records, a record label

Other uses
 Marian, an adjective for things relating to Gaius Marius
 Marian, an adjective for things relating to Mari people
 Marian, a noun for the students of Saint Mary's University of Bayombong, Nueva Vizcaya, Philippines
 Marian Apartments (disambiguation), two places on the US National Register of Historic Places
 Marian Party, those Scots who remained loyal to Mary, Queen of Scots in the disputes following her deposition
 UCD Marian, an Irish basketball club
 Marian, a student of Mount St Mary's School (New Delhi)

See also
 Mariana (disambiguation)
 Marianne (disambiguation) - for the French spelling
 Merian (disambiguation)